A Lady Takes a Chance is a 1943 American romantic comedy film directed by William A. Seiter and starring Jean Arthur and John Wayne. Written by Robert Ardrey and based on a story by Jo Swerling, the film is about a New York working girl who travels to the American West on a bus tour and meets and falls in love with a handsome rodeo cowboy. The film was produced for RKO Radio Pictures by Frank Ross, who was Arthur's husband at the time. The supporting cast features flamboyant comedian Phil Silvers, Hans Conried (without his stentorian Barrymoresque voice), Charles Winninger and Mary Field. The film earned a profit of $582,000.

Plot
Three of her suitors protest when Molly J. Truesdale, on a whim, boards a bus in New York City to find out what life in the American West is like.

Molly goes to a rodeo, where a bucking bronco tosses rider Duke Hudkins right into her lap. Duke buys her a beer afterward and then Molly brings him luck while gambling, but his partner Waco warns her that Duke is not the right guy for her.

In a campfire, more worried about his horse than about her, Duke discovers his horse Sammy's blanket has been borrowed by Molly and is furious with her when Sammy catches cold. Giving up, Molly goes home to New York and her waiting suitors, who are astounded when a tall cowboy suddenly shows up and carries Molly away.

Cast

 Jean Arthur as Molly J. Truesdale
 John Wayne as Duke Hudkins
 Charles Winninger as Waco
 Phil Silvers as Smiley Lambert (bus tour director)
 Mary Field as Florrie Bendix
 Don Costello as Drunk
 John Philliber  as Storekeeper
 Grady Sutton as Malcolm Scott
 Jean Stevens as "Jitterbug"
 Grant Withers as Bob Hastings
 Hans Conried as Gregg Stone
 Ariel Heath as Flossie
 Sugar Geise as Linda Belle
 Joan Blair as Lilly
 Tom Fadden as Mullen
 Dorcas McKim as Beggar Woman (uncredited)

References

External links
 
 
 

1943 films
1943 romantic comedy films
1940s Western (genre) comedy films
American black-and-white films
Films scored by Roy Webb
American Western (genre) comedy films
American romantic comedy films
Films directed by William A. Seiter
RKO Pictures films
Films with screenplays by Robert Ardrey
1940s American films